Korani or Korrani, also rendered as Kurani, may refer to:

 Korani, Burkina Faso, a village
 Yasukand, also called Korani, a city in Iran
 Korani District, an administrative subdivision of Iran
 Korani Rural District, an administrative subdivision of Iran
 Korani-ye Hashem Soltan, a village in Iran
 Korani-ye Olya, a village in Iran
 Korani-ye Sofla, a village in Iran
 Korrani, Fars, a village in Iran
 Kurani, Iran, a village in West Azerbaijan Province